FreshGames was a Columbus, Ohio based publisher and developer of casual, hand-held, and mobile games. It was formed in early 2002 by a group of gaming industry gamers. This new type of video game genre soon after became known as Casual Games.

The FreshGames catalog of games are available for multiple devices and platforms, including; Pocket PC, mobile phones and Apple iPod to online casinos and skills-based gaming sites.

FreshGames was sold by owner Stephan Smith in 2017.

History 
FreshGames released their first casual game Cubis in 2002. Cubis soon became one of the most popular games on various online game portals such as RealNetworks and Zone.com. Cubis was later awarded Best Logic Games of 2002 by RealOne Arcade, and was the 2004 Winner of the Microsoft Mobile2Market Application Contest.

The next game to come was the word game, Word Mojo. Also released in 2002, Word Mojo uses random sets of letters to build intersecting words. The following year FreshGames continued with their third title, Freakout. The objective is to clear 75% or more of the game board while dodging the bouncing balls.

On November 12, 2004 FreshGames launched their fourth title Cubis 2 then on September 12, 2006, Apple selected Cubis 2 to join their international launch of games on next generation iPods. In 2005, FreshGames entered into an agreement with Wagerlogic to design a 3D slot version of their internationally know game Cubis 2. This version known as Cubis Slots can only be found on casino sites outside of the US such as InterCasino. FreshGames also in 2005 licensed their games to World Winner, and then GSN.com offered their game as skills based games for money and prizes. FreshGames would not release another title until August 2007 when the company released their fifth game, a color-matching puzzle game known as ZenGems. In 2008, the company released Ranch Rush a farming simulation and time-management game. Ranch Rush had proved to be so popular across MAC, PC, retail and iPhone that it prompted FreshGames to publish a sequel.

In November 2009 FreshGames teamed up with the Action Against Hunger organization to promote the fight against hunger and malnutrition. FreshGames rose over $12,000 for the organization through the sales of their iPhone game Ranch Rush.

FreshGames released the sequel to the wildly popular game Ranch Rush with Ranch Rush 2 in 2010. Ranch Rush 2 was released for the PC, MAC, and Apple iPad, and a free web based version is also available with limited functionality.

Games 
FreshGames created twelve games: 
 Cubis (2002)
 Word Mojo (2002)
 Freakout (2003)
Cubis 2 (2004)
ZenGems (2007)
Ranch Rush (2008)
Ranch Rush 2 (2010)
 Cake Pop Party (2011)
 Escape the Titanic (2012)
 I Love Pop Culture (2013)
 Famous Faces (2015)
 Escape Alcatraz (2015)

Awards 
According to the official company website, FreshGames won several industry awards, including:
Zeeby Awards for Top Casual Games of 2007 for ZenGems
Top Casual PC Games of 2007 for ZenGems
Top 10 Game of 2004 from Shockwave.com for Cubis 2
2004 winner of Microsoft Mobile2Market Application Contest Awards for Cubis
1st Place Puzzle Game of 2003 by PDArcade for Cubis
Best Logic Games of 2002 by Real.com RealOne Arcade for Cubis
Top 10 Shareware Game of 2002 by Adrenaline Vault for Cubis

References

External links
 

Meta Platforms applications
Myspace
Video game companies established in 2002
Companies based in the Columbus, Ohio metropolitan area
Mobile game companies
Video game companies of the United States
Video game development companies
2002 establishments in Ohio